Doilbong  is a mountain in Gyeonggi-do, South Korea. It is located within the boundaries of Yangpyeong County.

See also
List of mountains in Korea

Notes

References

Mountains of South Korea
Mountains of Gyeonggi Province